Justice Willard may refer to:

John Willard (judge), justice of the New York Supreme Court, and ex officio an associate judge of the New York Court of Appeals
Ammiel J. Willard, associate justice and Chief Justice on the South Carolina Supreme Court